Koekenaap is a settlement in West Coast District Municipality in the Western Cape province of South Africa.

References

Populated places in the Matzikama Local Municipality